State Highway 48 (abbreviated SH-48) is a state highway in eastern Oklahoma that runs nearly  from Bryan County to Pawnee County. SH-48 has one lettered spur, SH-48A, in Johnston County.

Route description
SH-48 begins at SH-78 six miles (10 km) north of Durant. Running north, it is five miles (8 km) to the first highway intersection, SH-22, just west of Kenefic. Highway 48 continues on to the north, passing through the community of Folsom, and at Coleman, SH-48A spurs off to the west, towards the town of Milburn.

Seven miles ahead is Wapanucka, and the junction with SH-7. Nine miles past Wapanucka, SH-31 intersects, heading to the east, and in seven more miles Highway 48 reaches the town of Tupelo.

At Atwood, SH-48 splits off to the north, crosses the Canadian River,(the road originally angled west parallel to the river but was eventually rerouted after years of the river undercutting the roadbed) and soon enters the city of Holdenville, seat of Hughes County. SH-48 meets US-270 Business in Holdenville, then intersects US-270 just north of town. SH-48 intersects with SH-9 in northwestern Hughes County, and then turns to the east the junction with SH-99A, just west of Bearden.

Highway 48 turns back to the north soon after leaving Bearden, and crosses the North Canadian River just south of the I-40 junction. Two miles after I-40, SH-48 crosses SH-56 five miles (8 km) west of Okemah, then US-62 five miles (8 km) after that, just west of Castle.

The  between US-62 and the SH-16 junction in Bristow is very rural, with no settlements of any size. At Bristow, SH-48 joins SH-16 and SH-66 for a short three-route concurrency through town. SH-16 branches off just north of downtown Bristow, and SH-48/SH-66 intersect with I-44/Turner Turnpike at Bristow's northern edge.

Four miles after I-44, SH-66 splits off the east, and Highway 48 continues north eight miles (13 km) to SH-33, then another nine miles (14 km) to SH-51, two miles (3 km) west of Mannford. SH-48 crosses the Cimarron River and skirts the western edge of Keystone Lake as it travels its final few miles, intersecting with US-412/Cimarron Turnpike just before terminating at US-64, eight miles (13 km) south of Cleveland.

SH-48A

SH-48 has one lettered spur, State Highway 48A. SH-48A connects SH-48 to SH-78 at Milburn, in Johnston County.

Junction list

References

External links
SH-48 at OKHighways

048
Transportation in Bryan County, Oklahoma
Transportation in Johnston County, Oklahoma
Transportation in Coal County, Oklahoma
Transportation in Pontotoc County, Oklahoma
Transportation in Hughes County, Oklahoma
Transportation in Okfuskee County, Oklahoma
Transportation in Creek County, Oklahoma
Transportation in Pawnee County, Oklahoma